Ahmad Sajjadi  is an Iranian football goalkeeper who played for Iran in the 1988 Asian Cup.

Honours

AFC Asian Cup (third place): 1988

References
Teammelli.com Profile

External links
 

Living people
Iranian footballers
Footballers at the 1986 Asian Games
Bahman players
Homa F.C. players
1960 births
1988 AFC Asian Cup players
Association football goalkeepers
Asian Games competitors for Iran